The Consortium of Selective Schools in Essex is the organisation which organises the 11+ examination in Essex, England.

Consortium Members
Cecil Jones Academy
Chelmsford County High School for Girls
Colchester County High School for Girls
Colchester Royal Grammar School
King Edward VI Grammar School
Shoeburyness High School
Southend High School for Boys
Southend High School for Girls
St Bernard's High School
St Thomas More High School
Westcliff High School for Boys
Westcliff High School for Girls

References

Education in Essex